In the mathematical theory of infinite graphs, the Erdős–Dushnik–Miller theorem is a form of Ramsey's theorem stating that every infinite graph contains either a countably infinite independent set, or a clique with the same cardinality as the whole graph.

In their paper, they credited Paul Erdős with assistance in its proof. They applied these results to the comparability graphs of partially ordered sets to show that each partial order contains either a countably infinite antichain or a chain of cardinality equal to the whole order, and that each partial order contains either a countably infinite chain or an antichain of cardinality equal to the whole order.

If  is taken to be the cardinal number  itself, the theorem can be formulated in terms of ordinal numbers with the notation  , meaning that  (when it exists) has order type .

The Erdős–Dushnik–Miller theorem has been called the first "unbalanced" generalization of Ramsey's theorem, and Paul Erdős's first significant result in set theory.

References

Order theory
Ramsey theory
Set theory